Del Rio station is an intermodal transportation center in Del Rio, Texas, United States served by Amtrak, the national railroad passenger system, as well as by local bus service.

History
The station was built in the 1920s to replace an earlier wooden structure. It consists of a center block flanked by two recessed wings, one of which originally served as an outdoor waiting room. The main façade is dominated by five large, round-arch windows accented with scrolled keystones. Below the hipped roof of Spanish red tile, an entablature wraps around the center block. It features classic dentil molding as well as decorative panels, one of which reads “DEL RIO.”

References

External links

Del Rio Amtrak station information

Del Rio Amtrak Station (USA Rail Guide -- Train Web)

Amtrak stations in Texas
Former Southern Pacific Railroad stations
Railway stations in the United States opened in 1876
Buildings and structures in Val Verde County, Texas
Del Rio, Texas